Alinza is a genus of moths of the family Erebidae. The genus was erected by Francis Walker in 1866.

Alinza banianoides Schaus, 1916 French Guiana
Alinza cumana Schaus, 1916 Brazil (São Paulo)
Alinza discessalis Walker, [1866] Brazil (Amazonas)

References

Hypeninae
Noctuoidea genera